The 2018 Tampa Bay Rowdies season was the club's ninth season of existence, and their second in the United Soccer League. Including the previous Tampa Bay Rowdies, this was the 25th season of a franchise in the Tampa Bay metro area with the Rowdies moniker. Including the now-defunct Tampa Bay Mutiny, this was the 31st season of professional soccer in the Tampa Bay region.

Club
On October 2, 2018, the Tampa Bay Rays baseball club announced their purchase the Rowdies for an undisclosed amount, pending St. Petersburg City Council approval. Once the sale was finalized, Rays presidents Matthew Silverman and Brian Auld became vice chairmen of the soccer club. They, along with Rowdies vice president and chief operating officer Lee Cohen, became the team's directors.

Current roster

Technical staff

  Neill Collins - head coach (beginning May 18)
  Cheyne Roberts – assistant coach
  Martin Paterson – assistant coach
  Stuart Dobson – goalkeeper coach
  Blain Bott – strength and conditioning coach
  Bentley Smith – kit man
  Stuart Campbell – head coach (until May 17)

Medical staff
  Andrew Keane – head athletic trainer
  Michelle Leget – assistant athletic trainer
  Robert Dixon – message therapist
  Dr. Koco Eaton – team physician and orthopedic surgeon
  Dr. Mohit Bansal – team physician and orthopedic surgeon
  Dr. Christopher Salud – team physician
  Dr. Samuel Meyers – team chiropractor

Front office
  Stuart Sternberg – owner (beginning October 2)
  Lee Cohen – vice president and chief operating officer
  Matthew Silverman – vice chairmen (beginning October 2)
  Brian Auld – vice chairmen (beginning October 2)
  Bill Edwards – chairman, chief executive officer and governor (until October 2)

Competitions

Preseason / Friendlies 
The Rowdies hosted Major League Soccer teams in the Suncoast Invitational for the third year in a row.

USL

USL Eastern Conference table

Results summary

Results by round

Results

U.S. Open Cup

References 

Tampa Bay Rowdies
Tampa Bay Rowdies (2010–) seasons
Tampa Bay Rowdies
Tampa Bay Rowdies
Sports in St. Petersburg, Florida